Gopalganj is one of the administrative districts in the Indian state of Bihar. The district headquarters is the town of Gopalganj, and the district is part of Saran Division. Major languages spoken are Hindi and Bhojpuri.

Geography

Demographics

According to the 2011 census Gopalganj district, India had a population of 2,562,012, roughly equal to the nation of Kuwait or the US state of Nevada. of which 1,267,666 are males while 1,294,346 are females. This gives it a ranking of 163rd in India (out of a total of 640). Population within the age group of 0 to 6 years was 449,530 which is 17.54% of total population of Gopalganj district. Its population growth rate over the decade 2001-2011 was 19.02%. Gopalganj had a literacy rate of 65.47% and sex ratio of 1021 females for every 1000 males, Gopalganj ranks first in terms of sex-ratio (1,021) against the state's 918. 6.35% of the populatoin lives in urban areas. The Scheduled Castes and Scheduled Tribes population was 320,064 (12.49%) and 60,807 (2.37%) respectively. Gopalganj district had 411,930  households in 2011.

At the time of the 2011 Census of India, 96.09% of the population in the district spoke Bhojpuri, 1.85% Hindi and 1.76% Urdu as their first language.

Based on the 2011 census:
 Population: 2,562,012 (2.62% of the state)
 Density of population: 1260
 Men: 1,267,666 (49.48%)
 Women: 1,294,346 (50.52%)
 Urban population: 162,805 (6.35%)
 Rural population: 2,399,207 (93.65%)
 % of Scheduled castes: 12.49%
 % of Scheduled tribes: 2.37%

Politics 
  

|}

Administrative Division
Gopalganj is divided into 2 sub-divisions, 14 Blocks, 4 municipalities and 234 Gram Panchayats (village councils).

Urban councils
There are 4 urban areas in Gopalganj district. 3 Nagar Panchayat and 1 Nagar Parishad. Although Hathua is also an urban area categorized as Census town but not counted as municipality.

Village councils
There are 234 Gram Panchayats in Gopalganj district grouped into 14 blocks. There are total 1566 villages in Gopalganj District. There are 169 uninhabited villages (out of 1,566 total villages) in the district of Gopalganj.

Constituencies

Vidhan Sabha Constituencies 
Baikunthpur
Barauli
Gopalganj
Kuchaikote
Bhore
Hathua

Lok Sabha constituencies 

 Gopalganj

Education
Initially, Gopalganj had little to offer in terms of good quality education to its residents. Presently Schools and colleges in the city are either run by the government or by private trusts and individuals. The schools are each affiliated with either the Central Board for Secondary Education (CBSE), or the Bihar School Examination Board. English is the medium of instruction in most private schools; though government run schools offer both English and Hindi. The Sainik School prepares boys for entry into the National Defence Academy. After completing their secondary education, which involves ten years of schooling, students typically enroll at Higher Secondary School in one of the three streams—Arts, Commerce or Science.

Economy
In 2006 the Ministry of Panchayati Raj named Gopalganj one of the country's 250 most backward districts (out of a total of 640). It is one of the 38 districts in Bihar currently receiving funds from the Backward Regions Grant Fund Programme (BRGF).

Transport

NH 28 passes through Gopalganj one can find the multiple buses for commuting in state and other state.

Siwan Junction railway station is the main railway station for Gopalganj. Thawe station also serves local passenger other small station: Hathua Road, Sasamusa, Sipaya-(Serves Kuchaikote, Khutwania, Dubey Khariya, Vinod Khariya and nearby Villages), and Tamkuhi Road.
 
Sabeya Airport, Jay Prakash Narayan Airport Patna and Mahayogi Gorakhnath Airport, Gorakhpur are the nearest commercial airports.

Notable people
 Mukesh Kumar (cricketer)
 Ram Dulari Sinha of Indian National Congress, freedom fighter, former Union-Minister and Former Governor of Kerala, and freedom fighter, first Women to attain master's degree from Bihar and the first woman from Bihar to become Governor
 Abdul Ghafoor, former Chief Minister of Bihar, 1973 to 1975
 Lalu Prasad Yadav, former Chief Minister of Bihar and former Rail Minister of India
 Rabri Devi, thrice Chief Minister of Bihar, wife of Laloo Prasad Yadav
 U. K. Sinha, Chairman of the Securities and Exchange Board of India
 Anurag Kumar, Director, IISc.
 Pankaj Tripathi, actor
Subhash Singh (politician), Politician.
Janak Ram, Politician.
Amrendra Kumar Pandey,  Politician.
 Shambhu Sharan Shrivastava, Politician

References

External links
 Official website

 
Districts of Bihar
Saran division